Selo imeni Zhdanova is a rural locality (a selo) and the administrative centre of Krasnoarmeysky Selsoviet, Kizlyarsky District, Republic of Dagestan, Russia. The population was 1,987 as of 2010. There are 28 streets.

Nationalities 
Avars, Russians, Rutuls, Laks, Dargins, Lezgins, Kumyks and Armenians live there.

Geography 
It is located 3 km west of Kizlyar (the district's administrative centre) by road. Kizlyar and Krasny Voskhod are the nearest rural localities.

References 

Rural localities in Kizlyarsky District